Nadir Khan is a Pakistani Olympic middle-distance runner. He represented his country in the men's 1500 meters at the 1992 Summer Olympics. His time was a 3:44.96.

References

1966 births
Living people
Pakistani male middle-distance runners
Olympic athletes of Pakistan
Athletes (track and field) at the 1992 Summer Olympics
Asian Games medalists in athletics (track and field)
Asian Games bronze medalists for Pakistan
Athletes (track and field) at the 1990 Asian Games
Medalists at the 1990 Asian Games
20th-century Pakistani people